Sheikh Mohammad bin Mubarak Al Khalifa (born 1935) is a Bahraini politician and a member of the Bahrain's royal family. He served as Bahrain's Minister of Foreign Affairs from 1969 to 2005, and has been Deputy Prime Minister since then.

Education
Khalifa received his secondary education at the International School of the American University in Beirut. He holds a bachelor's degree in international relations and law, which he obtained from the University of London.

Career
He started his career as a judge and then became the director of public relations, director of media and head of foreign affairs during Bahrain's establishment in 1969. He was Minister of Foreign Affairs for nearly 35 years, from before Bahrain's independence in 1971 until a cabinet reshuffle on 29 September 2005, when he was replaced by Khalid ibn Ahmad Al Khalifah. Mohammad was instead appointed as one of three deputy prime ministers in the September 2005 reshuffle. During that time he was also Minister of Information. His official title is Deputy Prime Minister for Ministerial Committees.

References

1935 births
Living people
Alumni of the University of London
Muhammad Ibn Mubarak Ibn Hamad Al
Government ministers of Bahrain
Foreign ministers of Bahrain